Pascalia is genus of flowering plants belonging to the family Asteraceae. 

It is native to South America, and found in (north-eastern, north-western and southern) Argentina, Bolivia, Chile, Paraguay and Uruguay.
It has been introduced the following regions, Alabama, Florida, Georgia, (in USA), the Northern Provinces (South Africa), Palestine, Portugal, Spain, South Australia, New South Wales and Victoria (in Australia).

The genus name of Pascalia is in honour of Diego Baldassare Pascal (1768–1812), a French-born Italian doctor and botanist. He was also professor of botany in Parma and botanical garden director. 
It was first described and published in Nov. Rar. Pl. Descr. Dec. on page 39 in 1797.

Known species
According to Kew;

References

Heliantheae
Asteraceae genera
Plants described in 1797
Flora of Argentina
Flora of Bolivia
Flora of Chile
Flora of Paraguay
Flora of Uruguay